Meghpur is a village in Jaunpur, Uttar Pradesh, India. This village falls under Jalalpur Thana. The latitude and longitude position is 25.6037802, 82.7321342 . This Village is 4 km far away from Balavanh Railway station and 3 km From Jalalpur. This Village is 24 km away from Lal Bahadur Shastri International Airport. The neighbor villages are Purev, Mojara, Nahora, Than, Rasulpur, Lakamipur and Salempur.

References

Villages in Jaunpur district